Pierre Christoph Le Noir was Governor General of Pondicherry twice (first time as acting governor). During his rule, Yanaon was added to the French Establishments of India as a third colony in 1727. He expanded the Pondicherry area and made it a large and rich town. He worked as Director for Compagnie perpétuelle des Indes from 8 August 1736 and 7 October 1738 to 26 February 1743.

Titles

French colonial governors and administrators
Governors of French India
18th-century French people